Brestovo is a village situated in Novi Pazar municipality in Serbia. According to the census of 2002, there were 5 people (according to the census of 1991, there were 9 people) . According to the last census of 2011 the village was uninhabited..

References

Populated places in Raška District